Elizabeth Clarke (c. 1565–1645), alias Bedinfield, was the first woman persecuted by the Witchfinder General, Matthew Hopkins in 1645 in Essex, England. At 80 years old, she was accused of witchcraft by local tailor John Rivet. Hopkins and John Stearne took on the role of investigators, stating that they had seen familiars while watching her. During the process, she was deprived of sleep for multiple nights before confessing and implicating other women in the local area. She was tried at Chelmsford assizes, before being hanged for witchcraft.

Witchcraft trial
Elizabeth Clarke, also known as Bedinfield, was accused of cursing the wife of Manningtree tailor, John Rivet during the winter of 1643. A lynch mob brought her to Sir Harbottle Grimston, her landowner, who decided that she should be tried. Matthew Hopkins, assisted by John Stearne and Mary Phillipps, took up the role of investigator and prosecutor, known as "Watcher".

Although torture was illegal in England, suspected witches were subject to scrutiny by their Watchers. In Clarke's case, Hopkins and colleagues including John Stearne watched her for several days and nights without allowing her to sleep. After this treatment, Hopkins claimed to have witnessed Clarke summoning familiars, imps in animal form. During this ordeal, Clarke implicated other women from Manningtree, Anne West and her daughter Rebecca, Anne Leech, Helen Clarke, and Elizabeth Gooding as well as women from other villages. Clarke stated that she had been brought into witchcraft by Anne West, who took pity on her due to her poverty and only having one leg. The women discovered by Hopkins were tried at Chelmsford assizes on 17 July 1645.
Elizabeth then confessed due to the persuading, forcing and imprisonment, this led to 35 women who were accused and put to prison.

List of Clarke's familiars
During the testimonies of the watchers, they described many of the imps that he saw with Clarke, including:
Jarmana - a white dog with sandy spots, fat with short legs
Vinegar Tom - a greyhound with long legs, who turned into a 4-year-old boy with no head
A black imp
Newes - A pole cat with a large head
Hoult - a white imp, smaller than a cat 
White imps that went to bed with Clarke in the shape of a "proper gentleman" with a laced band.
Three brown imps from her mother
Sacke and Sugar - a demonic black rabbit
Other familiars referred to by name but not description: Elemauzer, Pyewacket, Peck-in-the-crown & Grizel Greedigut.

References

Further reading
The Witch-Cult in Western Europe

1560s births
1645 deaths
People executed for witchcraft
People from Essex
17th-century executions by England
16th-century English women
17th-century English women
Executed English women
Executed people from Essex
People executed by the Kingdom of England by hanging
Witch trials in England